Armida Publications is an independent publishing house based in Nicosia, Cyprus.

Founded in 1997 their primary goal is to promote high-level English-language publications from Cyprus, Greece, and the Eastern Mediterranean region in general. Their focus on Eastern Mediterranean enables them to carry titles from authors worldwide who have the region at the core of their work.

Over the course of their history, they have won and have been nominated for awards for literature from the European Union and also the International Rubery Book Award. Their title To Peirama (The Experiment) by Myrto Azina Chronides won the European Union Prize for Literature for Cyprus in 2011. They have translated works from the likes of Roger Willemsen and Emine Sevgi Ozdamar, and have published titles by, among others, Rory Maclean, Nick Danziger, Kevin Sullivan, Miltiades B. Hatzopoulos, Paul Stewart, Andreas Karayan, Nora Nadjarian, Lina Ellina, Chrysanthos Chrysanthou, Eve Meleagrou, Richard Romanus, Colette Ni Reammon Ioannidou, Jenny Benjamin, Yiangos P. Kleopas, Stefanos Evangelides, Mona Savvidou Theodoulou, Panos Ioannides, Rina Katselli, Theoclis Kouyialis, Victoria Hardwood Butler-Sloss, George Tardios, Theo Panayides, Melissa Hekkers, Metin Murat, Andrea Busfield, Giórgos Christodoulides and many others.

Armida was the first publishing company in Cyprus to establish an active e-books program for titles in Greek and English.

In addition, the company is also the leading exporter of literary rights of Greek Cypriot literature to foreign publishers, with an extensive network of collaborating partner publishers throughout Europe, and the world.

Armida is also an active member of the Independent Publishers Guild (UK) and the Independent Book Publishers Association (USA). Armida is a founding member of the Cyprus Association of Book Publishers, itself a part of the Federation of European Publishers (FEP). Armida worked in collaboration with the Cyprus PEN Centre, and published the quarterly magazine 'In Focus'.

History

1997 – 2011
Was predominantly Greek books distributed in Cyprus and Greece. In that period they co-published books with Aiora Press for the Greek market and also acquired rights to German titles. This early period is also noteworthy as they focused on acquiring translation rights compared to the present where they are a net exporter of the aforesaid rights.

2011 – present
Following the success of Myrto Azina’s The Experiment, which opened Armida up to a worldwide market, they signed an agreement with Ingram for the worldwide distribution of their English titles as well as expanded their operation to include electronic books of all formats, mainly focusing on the Amazon Kindle platform.

Armida is spearheading the effort to promote and popularize Cypriot fiction outside the narrow confines of the island. Subsequently, the company has become the premier rights-exporter for Cypriot fiction. Its extended network of collaborations includes multiple titles in multiple languages including Albanian, Arabic, Bulgarian, Croatian, Czech, English, German, Macedonian, Romanian, Turkish, Serbian, Spanish, Lithuanian, etc.

Special Projects

Work for the Deaf
Armida was part of a group of companies – namely AMP Filmworks Limited  and Art FX – that bid for a project by the Ministry of Education and Culture of the Republic of Cyprus. They worked together to document the Cypriot sign language in a dictionary, a grammar book for teachers and a grammar book for students,  accompanied by their respective DVD’s. This was a ground-breaking achievement in the realm of aids for the deaf globally as the detail undertaken was unprecedented for its time, taking three years to complete. The project was completed in 2011 and released these titles:

 Επικοινωνιακή Γραμματική (Communicative Grammar)
 Γραμματική Παραοδοσιακού Τύπου (Traditional Grammar)
 Εννοιολογικό Λεξικό (Conceptual dictionary)

Including a DVD for each book.

Films
Armida has also produced a short film by award-winning director Irena Joannides called Frequency.

Titles
Armida publishes a range of books in both English and Greek. The following is a list of there most notable titles, in both English and in Greek

English titles
A list of Armida's most notable English titles.

Greek titles
A list of notable Greek titles by Armida.

References

External links
 Official blog
 Official Facebook page
 Armida Publications on Amazon.com

Publishing companies established in 1997
Publishing companies of Cyprus
Companies based in Nicosia